Miejsko-Gminny Klub Sportowy Kujawiak Kowal is a football club from Kowal, Poland. It was found in 1954.

References
 Official website
 info about club on 90minut.pl

Association football clubs established in 1954
1954 establishments in Poland
Football clubs in Kuyavian-Pomeranian Voivodeship
Włocławek County